Shiryayevsky is a rural locality (a khutor) and the administrative center of Shiryayevskoye Rural Settlement, Ilovlinsky District, Volgograd Oblast, Russia. The population was 855 as of 2010. There are 16 streets.

Geography 
Shiryayevsky is located in steppe, on the Shiryay River, on the Volga Upland, 42 km north of Ilovlya (the district's administrative centre) by road. Nizhniye Lipki is the nearest rural locality.

References 

Rural localities in Ilovlinsky District